Vitosha Mountain TV Tower, better known as Kopitoto ("The Hoof") after the rock outcrop it stands on, is a  tall TV tower built of reinforced concrete on Vitosha Mountain near Sofia, Bulgaria. The footprint of the tower has the shape of a hexagon with three of the sides extended (i.e. almost triangular). From the tower there is a commanding view of Sofia, and the tower can be seen from everywhere in Sofia, making it a landmark of Sofia's skyline. It is the second tallest television tower in Bulgaria.

See also 
 List of towers
 List of tallest structures in Bulgaria

External links
 Pictures and description in Bulgarian
 

Towers in Bulgaria
Buildings and structures in Sofia